Lutibacter crassostreae is a Gram-negative, aerobic and non-spore-forming bacterium from the genus of Lutibacter which has been isolated from a oyster from the South Sea in Korea.

References

Flavobacteria
Bacteria described in 2015